Gurkha a 2019 Indian Tamil-language action comedy film written and directed by Sam Anton. The film stars Yogi Babu in the lead role, while Elyssa Erhardt, Anandaraj, Charle, Raj Bharath, and Manobala, among others, play supporting roles. The film is produced by 4 Monkeys Studio, with cinematography and editing is handled by Krishnan Vasant and Ruben respectively, continuing their association with the director. Music is composed by Raj Aryan. Principal photography commenced in around December 2018. It inspired by Steve Carr's Paul Blart: Mall Cop film.

Plot 
Bahadur Babu (Yogi Babu) belonged to a family of Gurkha who initially had the intention to become a cop, but unfortunately, he gets rejected as he is branded unfit and is unable to clear the physical fitness tests. He joins a security agency known as Shakthimaan Security Services owned by Kavariman (Manobala). Later in the movie, he gets posted as a security officer in a mall. The other characters who have a parallel story line in the movie are a gang of ex-servicemen headed by Thyagu (Raj Bharath) who on the sidelines plan an elaborate antisocial scheme and ultimately stage a take over of the mall where our lead character works in. Based on the scheme the people who are lured into visiting the movies under the false pretence of getting free tickets and shopping vouchers, including Bahadur Babu's love interest Margaret (Elyssa Erhardt), are held as hostages. In the end, it is up to Bahadur Babu to save the people and become a real hero.

Cast 

 Yogi Babu as Security Guard Bahadur Babu
 Elyssa Erhardt as Margaret
 Anandaraj as 'RDX' Alex
 Charle as Usain Bolt
 Raj Bharath as Thyagu and Shakil Akbar, ISIS Terrorist
 Manobala as Kavariman
 Aadukalam Naren as Nataraj IPS , Commissioner of police chennai city
 Ravi Mariya as ACP Harris Jayaraj
 Devadarshini as Gayathri
 Mayilsamy as Politician
 Livingston as Chief Minister of Tamil Nadu
 Namo Narayanan as Saamiyar (Priest)
 T. M. Karthik as QTV Owner
 Redin Kingsley as a hacker
Supergood Subramani as Margaret's assistant

Production 
The first look poster of the film was unveiled by actor Sivakarthikeyan on 15 September 2018 and the first look poster itself revealed that the film will be a summer release. The film titled as Gurkha implies that the film is based on security guards, and it is played by Yogi Babu. The movie was produced by Kishore Thallur under 4 monkeys studios. The filmmakers also reportedly hired Elyssa Erhardt, a Canadian model who earlier played a small acting role as an assistant to Sundar Ramaswamy (played by actor Vijay) in Sarkar). Elyssa will play the female lead as a foreign ambassador, along with a dog. The film also marks Elyssa's acting debut in Kollywood. The shoot wrapped in around early January 2019, and the reports confirmed that the film will be released in or around April 2019.

Soundtrack
Soundtrack was composed by Raj Aryan.

Hey Poya - Rita, Anthony Daasan
Chowkidar - Arunraja Kamaraj  
My Vellakaari - G. V. Prakash
Gurkha Theme - Arunraja Kamaraj

Reception

Srivatsan S for The Hindu  gave the film negative review, saying "Most of Gurkha takes place inside a mall, where a group of people, along with Margot, is held hostage by self-proclaimed terrorists. How appropriate, I wondered, for the actual hostages are the ones sitting inside the theatre."

The first look poster, which portrays Yogi Babu as gurkha along with a dog, created buzz among social media users related to racism and stereotype portrayal of the Gurkha community.

References

External links 
 

2019 films
2010s Tamil-language films
Indian action comedy films
Indian remakes of American films
2019 action comedy films